Nancy Cathedral (Cathedral of Our Lady of the Annunciation and St. Sigisbert) is a Roman Catholic church located in the town of Nancy, Lorraine, France. It was erected in the 18th century. The cathedral is in the Baroque architectural style. It is a national monument and the seat of the Bishop of Nancy and Toul.

History 

King Sigebert III of Austrasia was laid to rest here. Declared a saint later, the cathedral became a pilgrimage site. The cathedral is dedicated to the Holy Virgin and him.

The cathedral's architecture dates mainly to the 17-18th century.

Organ 

The great organ of the cathedral of Nancy has been built from 1756 by Nicolas Dupont. One century later (1861), Aristide Cavaillé-Coll signed here its biggest work in France outside of Paris. The organists of these Monument Historique organ are Johann Vexo (since 2009) and Guillaume Beaudoin (since 2014).

Notes

External links

Location
 and : Nancy Cathedral: photos
  Nancy Cathedral parish web site
 Official website about the organ of Nancy Cathedral
 Johann Vexo plays on the great organ of the cathedral of Nancy :
 J.S. Bach - Sinfonia of Cantata BWV 29 [video]
 J.S. Bach - Fantasy and fugue in C minor BWV 537 [video]
 F. Liszt - Consolation in D flat [video]
 C.M. Widor - Andante sostenuto (Symphonie gothique) [video] 
 Audio contents

Baroque buildings in France
Roman Catholic cathedrals in France
Roman Catholic churches in Nancy, France